Benno Edward Lischer (June 27, 1876 – October 9, 1959) was an American orthodontist who at one point was the president of American Association of Dental Schools and American Association of Orthodontists. He was the first full-time dean at Washington University School of Dental Medicine.

Life
He was born in Mascoutah, Illinois to Christopher Lischer and Caroline Freund. He attended elementary and high school in Mascoutah. He graduated from Washington University's dental program in April 1900 and received his dental degree there. He was married to Mary E. Lischer. After graduation, he served on the Washington University faculty from 1900 to 1924 teaching Operative Technique and Dental Anatomy. In addition he also taught as a professor at the Department of Orthodontics at University of Michigan School of Dentistry and at University of California, San Francisco. In 1933, Lischer returned to Washington Dental School where he was appointed the Dean of the dental school which he served until his retirement in 1945.

Orthodontics 
Dr. Lischer translated The Diagnosis of Dental Anomalies by German orthodontist Paul Simon. This textbook was regarded as the introduction of gnathic system as an aid to orthodontic treatment to United States. Lischer introduced the terms neutro-occlusion, mesio-occlusion and disto-occlusion to describe different varieties of malocclusion. In 1909 he published a textbook called Elements of Orthodontia. He stressed the importance of muscles, malformations and malocclusion.

Awards and positions
 Albert H. Ketcham Award
 Washington University School of Dentistry, Dean, 1933–1945
 American Association of Dental Schools, President
 American Association of Orthodontists, President
 St. Louis Dental Society, President

References

American orthodontists
People from St. Clair County, Illinois
Writers from Illinois
1876 births
1959 deaths
Washington University School of Dental Medicine alumni
University of Michigan faculty
Washington University in St. Louis alumni
University of California, San Francisco faculty
Washington University in St. Louis faculty